Serge Ankri (born 1949, in Tunis) is a film director.

He lived and studied in France and gained a Bachelor of Arts degree in Nice. He migrated to Israel in 1973. He is a graduate of the Film & Televsision Department, Tel Aviv University. He produced two short fiction films which were shown at the Festival of Mediterranean Cinema of Vittel in 1981: Love and Football and The Strike is Over.

He has worked for two years for Israeli Television as a cameraman and reporter. In addition to his activities as a film director, Ankri was the film critic for the weekly publication Realities at Israel and teaches cinema at Tel Aviv University.

Filmography
 Love and Football (1979)
 The Strike is Over (1982)
 Burning Land (1984)
 Strangers in the Night (1993)
 Mama's Couscous (1994)
 A Matter of Time (2005)

External links
 

French film directors
Israeli film directors
1949 births
Living people
Tel Aviv University alumni